Ola Byrknes (4 April 1933-30 November 2011) was a Norwegian politician for the Centre Party.

He served as a deputy representative to the Norwegian Parliament from Sogn og Fjordane during the 1973–1977 term.

On the local level he was a member of Gulen municipal councilfrom 1972 to 1999, serving as mayor from 1976 to 1978 and 1983 to 1999. He was a member of Sogn og Fjordane county council from 1976 to 1980.

He was also active in the Norwegian Association of Local and Regional Authorities.

References

1933 births
2011 deaths
Centre Party (Norway) politicians
Deputy members of the Storting
Mayors of places in Sogn og Fjordane